Quad City Eagles is an American soccer team based in Moline, Illinois, United States and whose home pitch is in Rock Island, Illinois. 
Founded in 2010, the team made its debut in the Midwest Division of the National Premier Soccer League (NPSL), the fourth tier of the American Soccer Pyramid, in 2011.  The club left NPSL following the 2014 season.

Players

Year-by-year

Head coaches
  Scott Mejia (2011–present)

Assistant coaches
  Jon Mannall (2011–present)
  Michael Regan (2012–present)
  Lucas Zicher (2012–present)

References

External links
 Official site

National Premier Soccer League teams
Eagles
Association football clubs established in 2010
2010 establishments in Illinois